The men's team squash event of the 2019 Pan American Games was held from July 28th – July 31st at the CAR Voleibol en la Videna in Lima, Peru. The defending Pan American Games champion is the team from Canada.

The United States team took the gold by defeating Colombia in the finals. Defending champion Canada and Mexico took home the bronze medals.

Results

Round Robin
The round robin will be used as a qualification round. The 12 teams will be split into groups of three. All teams will advance to the round of 16. The following is the group results.

Pool A

Pool B

Pool C

Pool D

Playoffs
The following is the playoff results.

5th-8th place
The following is 5th-8th place round results.

9th-12th place
The following is 9th-12th place round results.

Final standings

References

Squash at the 2019 Pan American Games